The Fourth Cabinet of Kim Kielsen was the Government of Greenland, in office between 15 May 2018 and 5 October 2018, where the coalition collapsed with the party Partii Naleraq leaving the coalition following a dispute of the funding of new international airports.
It was a coalition majority government consisting of Siumut, Atassut, Nunatta Qitornai and Partii Naleraq.

List of ministers

See also 
Cabinet of Greenland

References

 

Government of Greenland
Coalition governments
Politics of Greenland
Political organisations based in Greenland
Kielsen, Kim 2
2016 establishments in Greenland
Cabinets established in 2016
2016 in Greenland
Greenland politics-related lists